Murtaugh High School is a public high school in Murtaugh, Idaho, United States.  It is a very small school with about 250 students in grades 9–12.  It offers athletic programs for both girls and boys such as football, volleyball, basketball, and track.  It also offers BPA, HOSA, and FFA. The extracurricular activities are minimal.

External links
Murtaugh School District #418

Public high schools in Idaho
Schools in Twin Falls County, Idaho